Allosmaitia strophius, the Strophius hairstreak, is a butterfly of the family Lycaenidae. It is found from southern Brazil, north to Sinaloa, Mexico. Strays can be found as far north as Texas.

The wingspan is 22–32 mm. Adults are on wing year-round in Central America. In Texas, a stray was reported in November.

The larvae feed on the flowers of Malpighia species.

External links
Nearctica

Eumaeini
Lycaenidae of South America